Walter J. Vernon (May 27, 1905 – March 7, 1970) was an American comic and character actor and dancer.

Early life
Vernon was born in New York City in 1905. He was in show business from the age of three, appearing in vaudeville and stock theater; he made his first Hollywood appearance in 1937's Mountain Music.

Career
He made more than 75 films, almost always playing a Brooklynese wiseguy and/or the hero's assistant. He was a fixture in Twentieth Century Fox features of the late 1930s and early 1940s; Vernon is seen as an eccentric dancer in Fox's  Alexander's Ragtime Band (1938), where he appears as himself.

Vernon freelanced at other studios after leaving Fox. He became the sidekick to cowboy star Don "Red" Barry at Republic Pictures, and when Barry began producing his own features in 1949, he remembered Vernon and brought him back as his sidekick.

In 1948 Columbia Pictures producer Jules White paired Vernon with Eddie Quillan, another comedian with a vaudeville background. White emphasized physical comedy in films, and Vernon and Quillan indulged in pratfalling, head-banging, kick-in-the-pants slapstick. The Vernon & Quillan comedies were favorites of White, who kept making them through 1956.

In 1961, he appeared as a bartender in the TV Western series Bat Masterson (S3E18 "The Prescott Campaign").

Death
On March 7, 1970, Vernon died in an ambulance shortly after being struck by a hit-and-run driver in Hollywood, California. He was buried in Hollywood Hills at Forest Lawn Cemetery.

Films

 Mountain Music (1937) - Odette Potta
 You Can't Have Everything (1937) - Jerry
 This Way Please (1937) - Bumps
 Submarine D-1 (1937) - Sailor (uncredited)
 Happy Landing (1938) - Al Mahoney
 Kentucky Moonshine (1938) - Gus Bryce
 Alexander's Ragtime Band (1938) - Wally Vernon
 Meet the Girls (1938) - Delbert Jones
 Sharpshooters (1938) - Waldo
 Tail Spin (1939) - Chick
 Broadway Serenade (1939) - Joey - the Jinx
 Chasing Danger (1939) - Waldo Winkle [AFI Name: Waldo Rohrbeck]
 The Gorilla (1939) - Seaman
 Charlie Chan at Treasure Island (1939) - Elmer Kelner
 Sailor's Lady (1940) - Goofer
 Margie (1940) - Al
 Sandy Gets Her Man (1940) - Fireman Bagshaw
 Reveille with Beverly (1943) - Stomp McCoy
 Hit Parade of 1943 (1943) - Vaudeville Actor (uncredited)
 Tahiti Honey (1943) - Maxie
 Get Going (1943) - Comic Bit
 Fugitive from Sonora (1943) - Jack Pot Murphy
 Thumbs Up (1943) - Comedy Trio Member (uncredited)
 Black Hills Express (1943) - Deputy Deadeye
 A Scream in the Dark (1943) - Klousky
 The Man from the Rio Grande (1943) - Jimpson Simpson
 Here Comes Elmer (1943) - Wally
 Canyon City (1943) - Beauty Bradshaw
 Pistol Packin' Mama (1943) - The Joker
 California Joe (1943) - Tumbleweed Smith
 Outlaws of Santa Fe (1944) - Buckshot Peters
 Call of the South Seas (1944) - Handsome
 Silent Partner (1944) - Room Service Waiter
 Silver City Kid (1944) - Wildcat Higgens
 Stagecoach to Monterey (1944) - Throckmorton 'Other-Hand' Snodgrass
 Joe Palooka in Fighting Mad (1948) - Archie Stone
 King of the Gamblers (1948) - Mike Burns
 Behind Locked Doors (1948) - Maintenance Man (uncredited)
 Joe Palooka in Winner Take All (1948) - Taxi Driver
 He Walked by Night (1948) - Postman (uncredited)
 The Lucky Stiff (1949) - Card Player (uncredited)
 Square Dance Jubilee (1949) - Seldom Sam Jenks
 Always Leave Them Laughing (1949) - Wally Vernon - Comic
 Beauty on Parade (1950) - Sam Short
 I Shot Billy the Kid (1950) - Vicente
 Gunfire (1950) - Clem
 Train to Tombstone (1950) - Clifton Gulliver
 Border Rangers (1950) - Hungry Hicks
 Holiday Rhythm (1950) - Klaxon
 What Price Glory? (1952) - Lipinsky
 Bloodhounds of Broadway (1952) - Harry 'Poorly' Sammis
 Affair with a Stranger (1953) - Joe, Taxi Driver
 Fury at Gunsight Pass (1956) - Okay, Okay aka Johnny Oakes
 The White Squaw (1956) - Faro Bill
 What a Way to Go! (1964) - Agent

References

External links 

 

1905 births
1970 deaths
American male film actors
Eccentric dancers
Male actors from New York City
20th-century American male actors
Pedestrian road incident deaths
Road incident deaths in California